The 2016 Gibraltar Darts Trophy was the third of ten PDC European Tour events on the 2016 PDC Pro Tour. The tournament took place at the Victoria Stadium, Gibraltar, between 6–8 May 2016. It featured a field of 48 players and £115,000 in prize money, with £25,000 going to the winner.

Michael van Gerwen retained his title by defeating Dave Chisnall 6–2 in the final, after almost crashing out to the Gibraltarian Host Nation qualifier Dyson Parody, who missed three match darts in their quarter-final match.

Prize money
The prize money of the European Tour events stays the same as last year.

Qualification and format
The top 16 players from the PDC ProTour Order of Merit on 4 March automatically qualified for the event and were seeded in the second round. The remaining 32 places went to players from three qualifying events - 20 from the UK Qualifier (held in Barnsley on 11 March), eight from the European Qualifier on 22 April and four from the Host Nation Qualifier on 5 May.

Adrian Lewis withdrew due to personal reasons just as the tournament began, and was not replaced. This gave Max Hopp a bye to the third round. 

The following players took part in the tournament:

Top 16
  Michael van Gerwen (winner)
  Peter Wright (quarter-finals)
  Michael Smith (third round)
  James Wade (third round)
  Kim Huybrechts (semi-finals)
  Dave Chisnall (runner-up)
  Ian White (semi-finals)
  Adrian Lewis (withdrew)
  Jelle Klaasen (second round)
  Terry Jenkins (second round)
  Robert Thornton (third round)
  Benito van de Pas (third round)
  Gary Anderson (quarter-finals)
  Mensur Suljović (quarter-finals)
  Simon Whitlock (third round)
  Mervyn King (third round)

UK Qualifier
  Ross Smith (first round)
  Nick Fullwell (second round)
  Justin Pipe (second round)
  Stephen Bunting (second round)
  Gerwyn Price (second round)
  Daryl Gurney (second round)
  Alan Norris (second round)
  Jamie Lewis (first round)
  John Henderson (second round)
  Andy Hamilton (first round)
  Steve Beaton (first round)
  Mark Walsh (first round)
  Steve West (second round)
  Joe Murnan (third round)
  David Pallett (first round)
  Wayne Jones (first round)
  Kyle Anderson (first round)
  Kevin Painter (first round)
  Joe Cullen (second round)
  Stuart Kellett (first round)

European Qualifier
  Max Hopp (third round)
  Jermaine Wattimena (second round)
  Rowby-John Rodriguez (first round)
  Michael Rasztovits (second round)
  Cristo Reyes (first round)
  Dirk van Duijvenbode (first round)
  Christian Kist (second round)
  Antonio Alcinas (second round)

Host Nation Qualifier
  David Francis (first round)
  George Federico (first round)
  Dyson Parody (quarter-finals)
  Antony Lopez (first round)

Draw

References

2016 PDC European Tour
2016 in Gibraltarian sport
Darts in Gibraltar